Island Beach is a locality in the Australian state of South Australia overlooking Eastern Cove in Nepean Bay on the north-west coast of the Dudley Peninsula on Kangaroo Island about  from the state capital of Adelaide and about  from Penneshaw.

John Stewart Browne subdivided Island Beach in 1961 into 254 allotments, with average block sizes exceeding . Development stalled for a number of years, due largely to a reluctance of the local council to construct roads through the estate, which under planning regulations of the time were not the responsibility of the developer.

In the late 1970s a separate land subdivision occurred to the south of the original estate. Known locally as Carter's Estate, these allotments were more traditionally under  in size. Throughout the late 1980s and beyond, development accelerated with substantial seafront residences being erected, and land values beginning to rise.

 There is limited access to the beach for boat launching and retrieval.

Island Beach is located within the federal division of Mayo, the state electoral district of Mawson and the local government area of the Kangaroo Island Council.

References
Notes

Citations

Towns on Kangaroo Island
Coastal towns in South Australia
Beaches of South Australia
Dudley Peninsula